A strain is a series of musical phrases that create a distinct melody of a piece. A strain is often referred  to as a "section" of a musical piece. Often, a strain is repeated for the sake of instilling the melody clearly. This is so in ragtime and marches.

The Oxford English Dictionary lists this use of "strain" (n.2, III, 12) as part of the same noun more often used to denote an extreme of effort or pressure.  OED derives it from the verb, which could once be used to mean "sing," and speculates that this usage derives from one in which the word denotes increasing the tension of a string on a musical instrument.Formal sections in music analysis